Mary Morison Webster (1894 – 1980) was a Scottish-born novelist and poet who came to South Africa with her family in 1920. She lived in Johannesburg, where she was an influential book reviewer for The Rand Daily Mail and Sunday Times for 40 years. She wrote five novels, including one in collaboration with her sister, novelist Elizabeth Charlotte Webster, and several collections of poetry.

Poetry
Tomorrow (1922)
The Silver Flute (1931)
Alien Guest (1933)
Garland in the Wind (1938)
Flowers from Four Gardens (1951)
A Litter of Leaves (1971)
Rain After Drought

Novels
Evergreen (1929)
The Schoolhouse (1933)
High Altitude (1949, with Elizabeth Charlotte Webster)
The Slave of the Lamp (1950)
A Village Scandal (1965)

References
Adey, David, et al., comp. (1986). Companion to South African English Literature. Johannesburg: Ad Donker.

References in other works
Sweet and Sour Milk by Nuruddin Farah: the novel opens with an epigram quoting from Mary Webster's poetry.

1894 births
1980 deaths
South African women poets
20th-century poets
20th-century women writers
British emigrants to South Africa